Nice 'n' Tasty is an album by jazz pianist John Wright which was recorded in 1960 and released on the Prestige label.

Reception

The contemporaneous DownBeat reviewer wrote of Wright's playing: "while there are a couple of things in the Gospel-ly vein ('Yes, I Know'; 'Pie Face'), they are less impressive than his handling of a standard such as 'Witchcraft', or of Adderley's 'Things Are Getting Better'".

Track listing 
All compositions by John Wright, except where indicated.
 "Things Are Getting Better" (Julian Adderley) – 3:43
 "The Very Thought of You" (Ray Noble) – 6:15
 "Witchcraft" (Cy Coleman, Carolyn Leigh) – 5:25
 "Pie Face" – 5:08
 "You Do It" – 5:47
 "Darn That Dream" (Jimmy Van Heusen, Eddie DeLange) – 5:42
 "The Wright Way" – 4:00
 "Yes I Know" – 4:16

Personnel

Performers
John Wright - piano
Wendell Marshall  - bass
J. C. Heard - drums

Production
 Esmond Edwards – supervision
 Rudy Van Gelder – engineer

References 

1961 albums
John Wright (pianist) albums
Prestige Records albums
Albums recorded at Van Gelder Studio
Albums produced by Esmond Edwards